Adina Mercedes Bastidas Castillo (born 11 June 1943) is a Venezuelan economist, formerly active in politics. She was appointed the vice president of Venezuela on 24 December 2000 by President Hugo Chávez, and served in the post until 13 January 2002, the first woman to hold the job in the country's history. She was later appointed Production and Commerce Minister.

Bastidas was also the Director for the Bolivarian Republic of Venezuela at the Inter-American Development Bank in Washington, DC.

Views
According to the BBC, Bastidas is considered a controversial left winger; she is also considered a prominent critic of Venezuela's private sector.  Her appointment as Commerce Minister, coming after weeks of protests against President Chávez's economic policies, was seen as a further radicalization of Chávez's government, according to the BBC. Chávez called her "a first class revolutionary," and deemed her work "exceptional."

At the Latin American and Caribbean Encounter on the Dialogue of Civilizations, held in Caracas on November 8, 2001, Bastidas said:
"The terrorism of the oppressed is a perverse and lamentable byproduct of a WASP dominance that has become unbearable for the most radical and violent of the subjugated peoples ... Supplications and reason will not suffice to impose dialogue on countries of the North. The South must achieve a capacity to unite, resist, and persevere until it attains a new world order that is truly an order, not an immense disorder, under the heavens."

Personal life
On 13 January 2015, Bastidas was subject to burglary and robbery at her penthouse in Caracas, as stated by her son on his Twitter account. She refused to make any public statements regarding the event.

Notes

|}

1943 births
Living people
Vice presidents of Venezuela
Venezuelan women economists
Communist Party of Venezuela politicians
21st-century Venezuelan women politicians
21st-century Venezuelan politicians
Women government ministers of Venezuela
Women vice presidents
Venezuelan expatriates in the United States
Venezuelan guerrillas
Industry ministers of Venezuela
Trade ministers of Venezuela